General Sir Richard Wilbraham  (12 April 1811 – 30 April 1900) was a British Army officer who became colonel of the Royal Fusiliers (City of London Regiment).

Early life
He was a son of Randle Bootle-Wilbraham (1773–1861) of Rode Hall and, his second wife, Sibylla Egerton. Among his siblings was Charlotte Wilbraham (wife of Francis Cradock Twemlow).

His maternal grandparents were Philip Egerton, and Mary Eyles (a daughter of Sir Francis Haskins Eyles-Stiles), and among his maternal family were uncles Sir John Grey Egerton, 8th Baronet and Sir Philip Grey Egerton, 9th Baronet. His paternal grandparents were Richard Wilbraham-Bootle, MP for Chester, and the former Mary Bootle (daughter and heiress of Robert Bootle of Lathom House).  His uncle was Edward Bootle-Wilbraham, 1st Baron Skelmersdale.

Career
In the mid-1830s, Captain Wilbraham was attached to the Persian army to instruct local riflemen. The account of his travels in the lands between the Caspian and the Black Sea, including Georgia and the Caucasus, was published in London in 1839.

Wilbraham then served in the Syrian War. Promoted to major in the 7th Regiment of foot, Wilbraham served as Adjutant General of the 2nd Division during the Crimean War. He was promoted to lieutenant colonel in February 1855 and to colonel in August 1855. He also served as colonel of the Royal Fusiliers (City of London Regiment) taking up the post in 1881.

Personal life
On 24 November 1846, Wilbraham was married to his cousin, Elizabeth Frances Egerton (1821–1849), a daughter of Sibella ( Boswell) Egerton and William Egerton of Gresford Lodge, Denbighshire. Before her death, they were the parents of one surviving daughter:

 Katherine Frances Wilbraham (–1945), who married Sir George Barrington Baker Wilbraham, 5th Baronet, a son of Sir George Baker, 3rd Baronet and Mary Isabella Sutton.

Wilbraham lived at Rode Hall and died on 30 April 1900.

Descendants
Through his daughter Katherine, he was a grandfather of Sibylla Frances Baker Wilbraham (wife of The Ven. Percy Barnabas Emmet, Archdeacon of Nandyal), Sir Philip Wilbraham Baker Wilbraham, 6th Baronet (1875–1957), an ecclesiastical lawyer and administrator.

References

|-

1811 births
1900 deaths
Royal Fusiliers officers
British military personnel of the Egyptian–Ottoman War (1839–1841)
British Army personnel of the Crimean War
British Army generals
Knights Commander of the Order of the Bath
Military personnel from Cheshire